The boys' doubles tournament of the 2018 Badminton Asia Junior Championships was held from July 18 to 22. The defending champion from the last edition were Di Zijian and Wang Chang from China. Di / Wang of China and Shin Tae-yang / Wang Chan of South Korea are the top two seeded this year.

Seeded

 Di Zijian / Wang Chang (champions)
 Shin Tae-yang / Wang Chan (semifinals)
 Liang Weikeng / Shang Yichen (final)
 Ghifari Anandaffa Prihardika / Pramudya Kusumawardana (semifinals)
 Guo Xinwa / Liu Shiwen (quarterfinals)
 Abel Tan Wen Xing / Toh Han Zhuo (second round)
 Thanawin Madee / Wachirawit Sothon (third round)
 Hiroki Midorikawa / Hiroki Nakayama (second round)

Draw

Finals

Top half

Section 1

Section 2

Bottom half

Section 3

Section 4

References

External links 
Main Draw

2018 Badminton Asia Junior Championships